Soda Lake is a shallow, ephemeral, alkali endorheic lake in the Carrizo Plain in southeastern San Luis Obispo County, California. It can be reached by Soda Lake Road, which runs northwest–southeast between State Route 166 and State Route 58.

Endorheic drainage basin

Internal drainage of the Carrizo Plain and the formation of Soda Lake began during Pliocene-Pleistocene time when tectonic deformation associated with the San Andreas Fault defeated a stream that once drained the valley. An originally fresh to brackish water lake probably persisted through much of the Pleistocene during which coastal California was wetter and cooler than now. Diminished Holocene precipitation and a higher evaporation rate led to shrinkage of the ancestral lake and associated increased salinity which set the stage for clay dune formation.

About 30% of the closed or endorheic drainage basin is to the north of the lake and 70% is south of it. The Soda Lake complex consists of two larger basins, and at least 130 smaller pans. Water levels in the basins rise and fall seasonally. Most of the large and small pans are fringed by clay dunes. It is one of the largest alkali wetlands remaining in natural condition in California. It supports fairy and brine shrimp, as well as migratory and nesting birds. A boardwalk was built along the shore to prevent damage to the saltbush habitat that borders the lake.

Dunes
The largest dune bounds the eastern and southern edges of the northern basin. Part of the dune is active, receiving sediment from the mud flat exposed between the dune and the salt pan. Most of the eastern (north-south) leg of the dune, which is lower and narrower, is currently inactive. Westward retreat of the shoreline exposed the former lake flat to colonization and stabilization by salt-resistant plants.

See also
 List of lakes in California

References

(unsourced)

United States Bureau of Land Management - Carrizo Plain National Monument (Dead link)
United States Geological Survey - Carrizo Plain National Monument, California (Dead link)

External links

Virtual Guidebooks - Panoramas of Soda Lake

Landforms of San Luis Obispo County, California
Endorheic lakes of California
Dunes of California
Bodies of water of San Luis Obispo County, California